Maltecora is a genus of São Toméan jumping spiders that was first described by Eugène Louis Simon in 1910.  it contains only three species, found only in São Tomé and Príncipe: M. chrysochlora, M. divina, and M. janthina.

References

Salticidae genera
Salticidae
Spiders of Africa